Mesolia huachucaella is a moth in the family Crambidae. It was described by William D. Kearfott in 1908. It is found in the US state of Arizona.

The wingspan is 15–10 mm for males and 17–20 mm for females. The forewings are dark grayish brown. Adults are on wing from July to August.

References

Ancylolomiini
Moths described in 1908